The Irish National Final was held on Tuesday 25 January 1966 by RTÉ TV in Dublin, Brendan O'Reilly was hosting the event.

Before Eurovision

National final

At Eurovision
Ireland started at placement 17th at the end of the start field and finished 4th place with 14 points.

Voting

References

Eurovision Song Contest : National Final : Ireland 1966 - ESC-History.com
Eurovision Song Contest 1966 participants - ESCToday.com

1966
Countries in the Eurovision Song Contest 1966
Eurovision
Eurovision